María de los Ángeles Carrión Egido (born 22 February 1997), most commonly known as Leles, is a Spanish footballer who plays as a midfielder for Real Betis.

Club career
Leles started her career at CFF Albacete B.

References

External links
Profile at La Liga

1997 births
Living people
Women's association football midfielders
Spanish women's footballers
Sportspeople from the Province of Albacete
Footballers from Castilla–La Mancha
Fundación Albacete players
Valencia CF Femenino players
Rayo Vallecano Femenino players
Primera División (women) players
Segunda Federación (women) players